The 1990 Washington Huskies football team represented the University of Washington in the 1990 NCAA Division I-A football season.

The Huskies won their first conference championship since 1981 and defeated #17 Iowa in the Rose Bowl by twelve points, 46–34. It was the first victory in that game in nine years as well, when Washington crushed Iowa 28–0 in the 1982 game.  The Huskies were led by head coach Don James, offensive coordinator Gary Pinkel, and defensive coordinator Jim Lambright.  Pinkel left Washington after the season to become head coach at Toledo, where he stayed for a decade and then moved to Missouri.  Lambright succeeded James as head coach of the Huskies in August 1993.

Five Huskies were selected in the 1991 NFL draft, led by running back Greg Lewis and defensive back Charles Mincy.  Sophomore defensive lineman Steve Emtman was the first overall pick in 1992.

Schedule

Roster

Season summary
The Huskies were ranked #20 in the 1990 pre-season, and started slowly with close wins over San José State at home and at Purdue.  In the third game, #5 USC, in pursuit of a fourth straight Rose Bowl, entered Husky Stadium as a 5-point favorite with a four-game winning streak over UW, but was shut out 31–0 on a hot afternoon on the Seattle AstroTurf. The game started at 3:30 p.m. in the  heat and the opportunistic Huskies led 24–0 at the half. Sacked three times and under pressure all day, Trojan QB Todd Marinovich stated, "I just saw purple. That's all I saw. No numbers, no faces, just purple."

The Huskies suffered a letdown the following week, losing to #20 Colorado in Boulder by six. (Colorado would claim half of the 1990 national championship, tainted by the "fifth down" touchdown at Missouri the following week.)  The UW Dawgs regrouped and rolled through the next five games, all in conference and by large margins, and climbed to 8–1 record; they clinched the league title and Rose Bowl berth on November 3 after a 54–10 drubbing of #23 Arizona.

The Huskies moved up five places to a #2 national ranking, behind Notre Dame, when UCLA visited the following week.  In the wind and under dark but rainless skies on November 10, the 21-point underdog Bruins jumped out to an early lead with an 89-yard run. The game went back and forth, and was tied at 22 until a late field goal by UCLA ended UW's national title hopes. The Huskies took their frustration at the loss and their drop in ranking to #10 by crushing Washington State in Pullman to win the Apple Cup 55–10. The Cougars scored their touchdown on Husky reserves with less than three minutes remaining to close the margin to 45 points.

The #8 ranked Pac-10 champs then took on the Big Ten champions, #17 Iowa Hawkeyes, in the Rose Bowl, winning 46–34. Entering the fourth quarter with a 39–14 lead, reserves were entered into the game for the Huskies and promptly gave up two touchdowns; UW then scored its own touchdown to push the lead back to 46–26, answered by an Iowa TD and conversion to close the final score to a 12-point gap. The Huskies, like all Pac-10 teams in 1990, played an eight-game conference schedule. They did not play Oregon State, who finished last in the Pac-10 at 1–10 overall (1–7 in conference) and fired sixth-year head coach Dave Kragthorpe.

San Jose State

at Purdue

USC

"All I saw was purple," -Todd Marinovich on Washington's defense

at Colorado

Source: Box score

at Arizona State

at Washington State

vs. Iowa (Rose Bowl)

Awards
 Greg Lewis, running back: Doak Walker Award (inaugural)

NFL Draft
Five Huskies were selected in the 1991 NFL Draft, which lasted twelve rounds (334 selections).

Source:

Both 1990 Washington quarterbacks were selected in the 1993 NFL Draft.  Sophomore starter Mark Brunell was taken by the Green Bay Packers in the fifth round with the 118th pick.  Brunell was a reserve for two seasons behind Brett Favre in Green Bay, then led the expansion Jacksonville Jaguars in 1995.  Redshirt freshman Billy Joe Hobert was drafted by the Los Angeles Raiders in the third round with the 58th pick.

See also
 College football national championships in NCAA Division I FBS

References

External links
 YouTube – UW video – "All I Saw Was Purple" (vs. USC on September 22)

Washington
Washington Huskies football seasons
Pac-12 Conference football champion seasons
Rose Bowl champion seasons
Washington Huskies football